The 2014–15 Taça da Liga was the eighth edition of the Taça da Liga, a Portuguese football cup competition organized by the Liga Portuguesa de Futebol Profissional (LPFP). It was contested by a total of 36 clubs competing in the top two professional tiers of Portuguese football – 18 teams from the 2014–15 Primeira Liga plus 18 non-reserve teams from the 2014–15 Segunda Liga.

Title holders Benfica beat Marítimo 2–1 in the final and lifted the trophy for a sixth time.

Format 
The competition format for the 2014–15 edition consists of three rounds plus a knockout phase. In the first round, only teams competing in the 2014–15 Segunda Liga (excluding reserve teams from Primeira Liga clubs) take part. The eighteen teams are drawn into four groups (two with four teams and two with five), where each team plays against the others in a single round-robin format. The group winners and runners-up advance to the second round. 
In the second round, the eight teams that qualified from the previous round are joined by the five teams placed 11th–15th in the 2013–14 Primeira Liga and the three teams promoted to 2014–15 Primeira Liga. Two-legged ties are played between Primeira Liga and Segunda Liga teams, in a home-and-away system, and the winner advances to the third round.
The third round features the eight winners of the previous round and the ten teams ranked 1st–10th in the 2013–14 Primeira Liga. Similarly to the first round, the eighteen teams are drawn into four groups (two with four teams and two with five) and play each other in a single round-robin format. The four third-round group winners qualify for the knockout phase, which consists of two semi-finals and one final, both decided in one-legged fixtures. The final is played at a neutral venue.

Tiebreakers 
In the first and third rounds of the competition, teams are ranked according to points (3 points for a win, 1 point for a draw, 0 points for a loss). If two or more teams are tied on points on completion of the group matches, the following criteria are applied to determine the rankings:
highest goal difference in all group matches;
highest number of scored goals in all group matches;
lowest average age of all players fielded in all group matches (sum of the ages of all fielded players divided by the number of fielded players).

In all other rounds, teams tied at the end of regular time contest a penalty shootout to determine the winner. In the second round, teams are considered to be tied when they have equal aggregate scores at the end of both legs.

Teams 
The 36 teams competing in the two professional tiers of Portuguese football for the 2014–15 season are eligible to participate in this competition. For Primeira Liga teams, the final league position in the previous season determines if they enter in the second or third round of the Taça da Liga.

Key
Nth: League position in the 2013–14 season
P1: Promoted to the Primeira Liga
P2: Promoted to the Segunda Liga
R1: Relegated to the Segunda Liga

First round
Kick-off times are in WEST (UTC+01:00).

Group A

Group B

Group C

Group D

Second round
The draw for the second round was held on 3 September 2014 at 12:00. The sixteen teams involved in this draw were divided in two pots: one pot contained the eight teams progressing from the first round, and the other pot included the five teams that finished 11th–15th in the 2013–14 Primeira Liga and the three teams promoted to the top flight from the 2013–14 Segunda Liga. The first-leg matches were played on 24 September, and the second-leg matches were played on 29 October and 16 November 2014.

|}

Third round
Kick-off times are in WET (UTC+0).

Group A

Group B

Group C

Group D

Knockout phase
In the knockout phase, the four third-round group winners contested a one-legged semi-final match for a place in the competition final.

Semi-finals

Final

References

External links
 League Cup in numbers 

Taça da Liga
Taca da Liga
Taca da Liga